The discography of American musician Ed Roland consists of two studio albums as a solo artist, ten studio albums with Collective Soul, two studio albums with Ed Roland and the Sweet Tea Project, and one studio album with Alien Attitude.

Studio albums

With Collective Soul

With Ed Roland and the Sweet Tea Project

With Alien Attitude

Extended plays

With Collective Soul

Singles

With Collective Soul

Notes

+ "No More, No Less", "Why, Pt. 2" and "Better Now" peaked outside of the US Billboard Hot 100 chart, therefore they are listed on the Bubbling Under Hot 100 chart.

With Ed Roland and the Sweet Tea Project

As featured artist

Other appearances

References

Discography
Discographies of American artists
Rock music discographies